Lewis David Ritson (born 22 September 1993) is a British professional boxer. At regional level, he held the British lightweight title from 2017 to 2018, and challenged once for the European lightweight title in 2018.

Amateur career
Ritson first started boxing at the age of eight. He was an England international at amateur level and a dual title winner of the TTW belts at 67 kg and 71 kg respectively.  Ritson had 97 amateur fights in total and was also an ABA Seniors finalist.

Professional career

Early career
Ritson made his professional boxing debut in April 2015 with a points win over Kristian Laight at the Metro Radio Arena in Newcastle. He went on to box a further six times throughout the remainder of the year, winning all six; two by knockout. Ritson won all five of his fights in 2016, culminating in him securing the BBBofC Northern Area lightweight title with a seventh-round knockout win over Jordan Ellison on 3 December 2016. As a result of his early performances as a professional, Ritson received interest from promoters Eddie Hearn, Barry McGuigan and Frank Warren.

British lightweight champion

Ritson vs. Barrett 
Having spent the first two years of his professional boxing career competing largely on small hall shows, Ritson fought live on Sky Sports for the first time on the undercard for Anthony Crolla–Ricky Burns at the Manchester Arena on 7 October 2017. He defeated Robbie Barrett by way of TKO in the seventh round having dropped Barrett on four occasions, in doing so winning the British lightweight title. Just three days after the fight, on 10 October 2017, he signed a promotional deal with Matchroom Boxing, with Ritson highlighting his next goal to successfully defend the title three times and consequently win the Lonsdale Belt outright.

Ritson vs. Murray 
Ritson's first defence of his British title was pencilled in when he answered Joe Murray's challenge, with the pair headlining the Sky Sports NXTGEN bill in Manchester on 25 February 2018. Ritson won the bout courtesy of a "whirlwind stoppage victory" in the first round and afterwards discussed the possibility of fighting former British lightweight champion Scott Cardle, who was watching ringside.

Ritson vs. Cardle 
Cardle was subsequently named as Ritson's next opponent on the Dillian Whyte–Lucas Browne undercard at The O2 Arena on 24 March 2018. Ahead of the fight, Ritson stated "I've been on small hall shows in the past and now I'm headlining on Sky Sports and heading to The O2 on a big show – it's amazing and I'm working hard to make sure that this is just the beginning". Ritson successfully retained his British lightweight title with a second round stoppage victory over Cardle.

Ritson vs. Hyland Jnr 
He was then matched to defend his British lightweight title against unbeaten Northern Irish boxer Paul Hyland Jnr, co-headlining the Sky Sports event at the Metro Radio Arena in his home city of Newcastle on 16 June 2018. Ritson won the fight courtesy of a first round stoppage having knocked Hyland Jnr down three times in the opening round. The win meant that he secured the British lightweight belt outright. Four days after the fight, Ritson signed a new five-fight deal with Matchroom Boxing.

European lightweight challenge

Ritson vs. Amador 
Matchroom Boxing announced that Ritson would headline a card at the Metro Radio Arena in Newcastle in October 2018, where he would challenge for the European lightweight title. His opponent was revealed as former titleholder Francesco Patera on 28 August 2018, with the two competing for the vacant title. Before challenging for the European title, Ritson would first appear on the Amir Khan undercard at the Arena Birmingham on 8 September 2018, in an eight-round "warm-up fight" that was made in the hope Ritson would get some rounds under his belt having fought for a total of four rounds over the course of the previous year. Ritson knocked out Nicaraguan boxer Oscar Amador following a body shot at the beginning of round three of the bout.

Ritson vs. Patera 
Ritson lost to Patera by split decision on 13 October 2018. Two judges scored the fight 116–112, 116–112 for Patera, and the remaining judge scored it 116–112 in Ritson's favour. Following the defeat, Ritson stated a body shot in the fifth round hurt him and that he did not fully recover for the remainder of the fight.

Move to light welterweight

Ritson vs. Benitez 
Ritson was initially meant to defend his British lightweight title against Andy Townend at the Copper Box Arena in London on 23 March 2019. It was then stated that Ritson would be vacating his British lightweight title and moving up a weight division to light welterweight, fighting Argentina's German Argentino Benitez for the WBA Inter-Continental super-lightweight title. On his move up to light welterweight, Ritson stated "now is the right time to move up to 140lbs. I probably should have moved up in weight a while ago but I was determined to test myself on the European scene which is why I carried on." Ritson defeated Benitez by unanimous decision over ten rounds.

Ritson vs. Jedrzejewski 
Ritson defended his WBA Inter-Continental light welterweight title against Polish challenger Marek Jedrzejewski on 2 August 2019. The referee called a stop to the one-sided bout at 2:50 of the 3rd round. This win set up a fight with Robbie Davies Jr. on 19 October.

Ritson vs. Ponce 
On 12 June 2021 Riston faced Jeremias Ponce in a IBF Super-Lightweight World Title eliminator fight. Ponce was ranked #5 by the IBF at super lightweight. Ritson was dominated in the fight and was eventually knocked down three times in the fight, which ended with a tenth round stoppage loss.

Ritson vs. Zlaticanin 
Ritson beat Dejan Zlaticanin by unanimous decision in their 10 round contest on 25th March 2022 at Newcastle Arena in Tyne and Wear. The scorecards read 100-90, 100-90, 99-91 in favor of Ritson.

Personal life
Ritson is a Newcastle United supporter and wears the club's black and white stripes on his customary shorts. He walks to the ring to Geordie folk song Blaydon Races.

Professional boxing record

References

External links

Lewis Ritson - Profile, News Archive & Current Rankings at Box.Live

1993 births
Living people
English male boxers
Sportspeople from Newcastle upon Tyne
Lightweight boxers
British Boxing Board of Control champions